Marco Mancinelli (born 31 January 1982) is a former Italian footballer.

Biography
Born in Recanati, Marche, Mancinelli started his career at Ascoli Calcio 1898. He was signed by Hellas Verona F.C. in 2000 for its reserve. he capped for Italy national under-20 football team from 2001 to 2002, winning 2002 Under-20 Four Nations Tournament and finished as the second in 2001 Mediterranean Games. In July 2002 he left on loan to Martina and the loan was renewed in 2003. he wore no.26 shirt for Verona in 2004–05 Serie B. Mancinelli left for Vicenza Calcio in June 2005 in a direct swap with Gilberto Zanoletti (also in co-ownership), both tagged for €475,000. However, on 31 August, Verona bought back Mancinelli and sold back Zanoletti, both for free, as well as bought half of Julien Rantier's contract for €270,000. The direct swap made both club had a player selling revenue of €950,000 (documented in 2005–06 financial year on Vicenza side) and a player acquire cost which would amortize in the rest of the new player contract as worse VAT. On Verona side, Mancinelli's new contract value was amortize from 2005 to 2009, or a cost of an average of €237,500 a season. In January 2007 he left for Ancona in temporary deal.

References

External links
 Profile at Serie B official site 
 Football.it Profile 
 FIGC Archive 

Italian footballers
Italy youth international footballers
Hellas Verona F.C. players
A.S.D. Martina Calcio 1947 players
L.R. Vicenza players
A.C. Ancona players
Calcio Lecco 1912 players
Serie B players
Association football midfielders
People from Recanati
1982 births
Living people
Mediterranean Games silver medalists for Italy
Mediterranean Games medalists in football
Competitors at the 2001 Mediterranean Games
Sportspeople from the Province of Macerata
Footballers from Marche